Kim Hye-in (born January 16, 1993) is a South Korean actress. She is perhaps best known for her role in the television series Hospital Playlist (2020–2021).

Career
In July 2012, Kim was crowned World Miss University Korea while she was majoring in dance at the Ewha Womans University.

She made her acting debut in the film The Throne (2015) and has since appeared in the television series Entourage (2016), Hospital Playlist (2020–2021), which is one of the highest-rated Korean series in cable television history, and She Would Never Know (2021).

Filmography

Film

Television

References

External links
 
 

1993 births
Living people
Ewha Womans University alumni
South Korean beauty pageant winners
South Korean film actresses
South Korean television actresses
21st-century South Korean actresses